Sir Edmund Samuel Hayes, 3rd Baronet MP (2 July 1806 – 23 June 1860) of Drumboe Castle, County Donegal was a Baronet in the Baronetage of Ireland and Member of Parliament for County Donegal from 1831 to 1860.

Family

He was born on 2 July 1806, the son of Sir Samuel Hayes, 2nd Baronet and Elizabeth Lighton, daughter of Sir Thomas Lighton, 1st Baronet MP of Merville, County Dublin.

He was educated at Trinity College, Dublin in 1823. He was appointed High Sheriff of Donegal for 1830–31.

On 3 July 1837, he married Emily Pakenham, daughter of Hon. Hercules Robert Pakenham. The children from this marriage were:
Sir Samuel Hercules Hayes, 4th Baronet (3 February 1840 – 7 November 1901)
Sir Edmund Francis Hayes, 5th Baronet (1850 - 1912)
Emily Anne Hayes
Mary Frances Hayes
Alice Caroline Hayes
Emma Agnes Hayes
Georgina Mary Anne Hayes
Louisa Lydia Hayes
Anayah Tapia
He died on 23 June 1860.

Career

He was campaigned in the 1831 United Kingdom general election and was elected Member of Parliament for County Donegal which he held until his death in 1860.

He was a founding member of the Carlton Club.

Notes

References

External links 
 

1806 births
1860 deaths
Alumni of Trinity College Dublin
Baronets in the Baronetage of Ireland
Members of the Parliament of the United Kingdom for County Donegal constituencies (1801–1922)
High Sheriffs of Donegal
UK MPs 1831–1832
UK MPs 1832–1835
UK MPs 1835–1837
UK MPs 1837–1841
UK MPs 1841–1847
UK MPs 1847–1852
UK MPs 1852–1857
UK MPs 1857–1859
UK MPs 1859–1865
People from County Donegal